SL-9 may refer to:

Proton rocket, type 8K82, used from 1965-1966
Heckler & Koch SL8, a semi-automatic rifle
Comet Shoemaker–Levy 9
Schütte-Lanz SL.9 An Imperial German Army WWI airship.
(88710) 2001 SL9, a sub-kilometer asteroid and binary system